"Think It Over" is a 1978 song by Cheryl Ladd.  It was released as a single from her eponymous debut album.  The song was released following the second season of Charlie's Angels, the first in which Ladd was cast.

The song became a Top 40 hit in the United States and Canada on both the pop singles charts as well as the Adult Contemporary charts.  It had its best showing on the Canadian AC chart, where it peaked at #29. The single was also released in the UK, the Netherlands and Japan.

"Think It Over" was Ladd's only song to chart, although another track from the album, her original version of "I'll Never Love This Way Again," became a Top 5 hit when covered by Dionne Warwick in 1979.

Chart history

References

External links
 

1978 songs
1978 singles
Cheryl Ladd songs
Capitol Records singles
Songs written by Brenda Russell